Rear Admiral Benjamin Bryant,  (16 September 1905 – 23 November 1994) was a Royal Navy officer noted for his submarine exploits during the Second World War. In terms of ships sunk, Bryant was the most successful British submarine commander to survive the war. He was appointed Deputy Chief of Naval Personnel, (Training) from July 1954 to February 1957.

Early life
Bryant was born in Madras, British India, then the winter capital of the Madras Presidency; his father, John Forbes Bryant, was a member of the Indian Civil Service. His mother was Mary Ada (née Genge). He had an elder brother Joseph and elder sister May. Bryant returned from India as a boy and attended Oundle School and then the Royal Naval College, Osborne and Royal Naval College, Dartmouth.

Bryant published a book, One Man Band: The Memoirs of a Submarine C.O., in 1958 about his experience up to and including the Second World War.

Second World War
As a lieutenant commander, Bryant served aboard  from 3 September 1938 to 12 October 1941. He then commanded  from Between 14 October 1941	to 27 April 1943, the submarine depot ship  from 16 June 1944 to 10 October 1944, the submarine depot ship  from 30 October 1944 to 4 February 1945.

For his services during the Second World War, Bryant was awarded the Distinguished Service Cross on 9 May 1940, Mentioned in Despatches on 12 May 1942, and awarded the Distinguished Service Order (DSO) on 23 March 1943, which was followed by two Bars to the DSO on 11 May and 6 July the same year. He was later appointed a Companion of the Order of the Bath in 1956.

References

External links
Portrait of Bryant by Robert Sivell

1905 births
1994 deaths
Royal Navy officers of World War II
Graduates of Britannia Royal Naval College
Companions of the Distinguished Service Order
Recipients of the Distinguished Service Cross (United Kingdom)
Companions of the Order of the Bath
People educated at Oundle School
People educated at the Royal Naval College, Osborne
Military personnel of British India